Kristers Tobers (born 13 December 2000) is a Latvian professional footballer who plays as a centre-back or defensive midfielder for Ekstraklasa side Lechia Gdańsk and the Latvia national team.

Career
Tobers made his international debut for Latvia on 21 March 2019, coming on as a substitute for Artūrs Karašausks in the 68th minute of the UEFA Euro 2020 qualifying match against North Macedonia, which finished as a 1–3 away loss. In January 2020, he joined Lechia Gdańsk on a loan with an option of permanent transfer after the end of the season. On 7 February 2020 he made his Ekstraklasa debut against Śląsk Wrocław playing as a midfielder. After only seven games, Lechia triggered the option and Tobers signed a permanent deal until June 2023.

Career statistics

International

References

External links
 
 
 
 

2000 births
Living people
People from Dobele
Latvian footballers
Latvian expatriate footballers
Latvia youth international footballers
Latvia under-21 international footballers
Latvia international footballers
Association football midfielders
FK Liepāja players
Lechia Gdańsk players
Latvian Higher League players
Ekstraklasa players
Expatriate footballers in Poland
Latvian expatriate sportspeople in Poland